Skógar (pronounced ), literally "forests", is a small Icelandic village with a population of roughly 25 located at the south of the Eyjafjallajökull glacier, in the municipality of Rangárþing eystra.

The area is known for its waterfall, Skógafoss, on the Skógá  river, which springs from 60 metres at the top of an eroded cliff. At Skógar is a folk museum, Skógasafn , as well as a museum on transport in Iceland.

Not far from Skógar is the Kvernufoss  fall. Further upstream on the Skógá river there are a number of other falls. While climbing in the small forest behind the old school, some ruins of old farms can be seen.

This settlement was severely affected by the eruption of the Eyjafjallajökull volcano in 2010.

Gallery

See also
List of settlements in Iceland
Waterfalls of Iceland

References

External links
Information
Information on the museum (in Icelandic)

Description, map view, and track download of the Laugavegur and Fimmvörðuháls trails starting at Skógar

Populated places in Southern Region (Iceland)